The 2014 WAC women's basketball tournament will be held on March 12–15, 2014, at the Orleans Arena in  Paradise, Nevada.  This will be the third consecutive year the WAC Tournament takes place in Vegas.

Format
Grand Canyon will not compete in the 2014 men's basketball tournament. As a D2 to D1 transitioning school, they are ineligible to compete in the NCAA tournament until the 2018 season, so they cannot win the conference tournament since the winner gets an automatic bid to the NCAA Tournament. However Grand Canyon will be eligible to win the regular season title and is eligible to compete in the WNIT or WBI should they be invited. 

8 teams will compete in the 2014 tournament in a traditional single-elimination style tournament, with 1 playing 8, 2 playing 7, 3 playing 6, and 4 playing 5 on Wednesday, March 12. The winners will meet in the semifinals on Friday, March 14. The championship will air Saturday, March 15.

Seeds

Schedule

Bracket

Game Summaries
Game Summaries will be added once the tournament bracket is finalized.

All tournament conference team

References

2013–14 Western Athletic Conference women's basketball season
WAC women's basketball tournament
2014 in sports in Nevada
Basketball competitions in the Las Vegas Valley
College basketball tournaments in Nevada
Women's sports in Nevada
College sports tournaments in Nevada